Dzus may refer to:

 Asteroid 3687 Dzus
 Dzus fastener